Vlachovice may refer to places in the Czech Republic:
 Vlachovice (Zlín District), a municipality and village in the Zlín Region
 Vlachovice (Žďár nad Sázavou District), a municipality and village in the Vysočina Region